The East Jerusalem Central Bus Station is an Arab transportation hub serving Arab neighborhoods in Jerusalem and the West Bank. It is located on Sultan Suleiman Street across from the Old City's Damascus Gate.

Established in 1953, the station was leased to the Jerusalem municipality for thirty years. It is owned and operated by the Waqf administration responsible for a number of properties in the Old City.

See also
 Jerusalem Central Bus Station
 Jerusalem Light Rail

References

Buildings and structures in Jerusalem
Transport in Jerusalem
Jordanian construction in eastern Jerusalem
1950s in Jerusalem